The 1992–93 NHL season was the 76th regular season of the National Hockey League. Each player wore a patch on their jersey throughout the season to commemorate the 100th anniversary of the Stanley Cup. The league expanded to 24 teams with the addition of the Ottawa Senators and the Tampa Bay Lightning.

The Montreal Canadiens won their league-leading 24th Cup by defeating the Los Angeles Kings four games to one. This remains the last time that a Canadian team has won the Stanley Cup.

It proved, at the time, to be the highest-scoring regular season in NHL history, as a total of 7,311 goals were scored over 1,008 games for an average of 7.25 per game. Twenty of the twenty-four teams scored three goals or more per game, and only two teams, the Toronto Maple Leafs and the Chicago Blackhawks, allowed fewer than three goals per game. Only 68 shutouts were recorded during the regular season. A record twenty-one players reached the 100-point plateau, while a record fourteen players reached the 50-goal plateau—both records still stand as of the 2021–22 NHL season.

Through the halfway point in this season Mario Lemieux was in the process of putting together one of the most historic seasons in NHL history; being on pace to challenge both the 92 goal and 215 point records of Wayne Gretzky when he was diagnosed with Hodgkins Lymphoma. Lemieux still went on to win the Art Ross and Hart Trophies, despite every other player in the top five in league scoring playing a complete 84 game season to his 60 games. He also finished with the third highest point per game average in a season in league history.

League business

This was the final season of the Wales and Campbell Conferences, and the Adams, Patrick, Norris, and Smythe divisions. Both the conferences and the divisions would be renamed to reflect geography rather than the league's history for the following season. This was also the last year (until the 2013 realignment) in which the playoff structure bracketed and seeded teams by division; they would be bracketed and seeded by conference (as in the NBA) for 1993–94.

This season saw two new clubs join the league: the Ottawa Senators and the Tampa Bay Lightning. The Senators were the second Ottawa-based NHL franchise (see Ottawa Senators (original)) and brought professional hockey back to Canada's capital, while the Tampa Bay franchise (headed by Hockey Hall of Fame brothers Phil and Tony Esposito) strengthened the NHL's presence in the American Sun Belt, which had first started with the birth of the Los Angeles Kings in 1967.

This was also the final season of play for the Minnesota North Stars, before relocating to Dallas, Texas, the following season.

All teams wore a commemorative patch this year celebrating the 100th anniversary of the Stanley Cup.

Gil Stein was appointed NHL President in the summer of 1992, on an interim basis. John Ziegler having resigned, after serving for 15 years.

On February 1, 1993, Gary Bettman became the first NHL Commissioner. With the expiration of Gil Stein's tenure on July 1, 1993 (note: Bettman's office was created senior to Stein's), the position of President was merged into the position of Commissioner.

On March 28, 1993, through a brokered deal with ESPN, ABC begins the first of a two year deal with the National Hockey League to televise six regional Sunday afternoon broadcasts (including the first three Sundays of the playoffs). This marked the first time that regular season National Hockey League games were broadcast on American network television since  (when NBC was the NHL's American broadcast television partner).

Rule changes
Schedule length changed to 84 games. Two games in each team's schedule to be played in non-NHL cities.
Instigating a fight results in a game misconduct penalty.
Substitutions disallowed for coincidental minor penalties when teams are at full strength.
Minor penalty for diving introduced.

Regular season
Teemu Selanne of the Winnipeg Jets shattered the rookie scoring record by scoring 76 goals and 56 assists for 132 points this season. He was named the winner of the Calder Memorial Trophy as the NHL Rookie of the Year, and his goals and points marks remain the NHL rookie records .

The New York Rangers missed the playoffs. This marked the first time since the President's Trophy had been introduced that the previous season's top team missed the next year's playoffs.

For the first time in his NHL career, Wayne Gretzky did not finish in the top three in scoring. A back injury limited Gretzky to 45 games in which he scored 65 points.

The Pittsburgh Penguins set a new NHL record, winning 17 consecutive games. The streak ending with the regular season.

Final standings
Note: W = Wins, L = Losses, T = Ties, GF = Goals for, GA = Goals against, Pts = Points

Prince of Wales Conference

Clarence Campbell Conference

Playoffs

Playoff bracket

Stanley Cup Finals

NHL awards

All-Star teams

Player statistics

Scoring leaders

Leading goaltenders

Neutral-site games
As a part of the 1992 strike settlement, the NHL and Bruce McNall's Multivision Marketing and Public Relations Co. organized 24 regular season games in 15 cities that did not have a franchise, providing as a litmus test for future expansion. Four of the cities chosen – Phoenix, Atlanta, Dallas and Miami – were eventually the sites of expansion or relocations, and although neither Cleveland nor Cincinnati received NHL franchises, there would be one placed in Columbus, located halfway between the two cities.

Two arenas that hosted neutral-site games had hosted NHL teams before: Atlanta's The Omni (Atlanta Flames) and Cleveland's Richfield Coliseum (Cleveland Barons).

The Hartford-St. Louis game was originally scheduled to be played on December 29, 1992, in Birmingham, Alabama.

Events and milestones
 Manon Rhéaume became the first woman to play for a major sports league in North America as she tended goal for the Tampa Bay Lightning in an exhibition game on September 23, 1992, against the St. Louis Blues.
 The Ottawa Senators and Tampa Bay Lightning were two new teams to be added to the league, bringing the league to 24 teams, one-third of which were Canadian teams, as they comprised eight of the twenty-four teams. Both teams would win their opening games and briefly sit atop their respective Divisions, which led to Harry Neale jokingly proclaiming before the end of Ottawa's first win that both the Senators and Lightning would reach the Stanley Cup finals in May.
 October 1992: Gil Stein named NHL President.
 February 1993: Gary Bettman named NHL Commissioner.
 Record set for most 100-point scorers and most 50-goal scorers in one season.
 February 10, 1993: In a 13–1 drubbing of the San Jose Sharks, Calgary Flames goaltender Jeff Reese set NHL records for most points and most assists by a goaltender in one game, with three.
 The 1993 Stanley Cup playoffs marked the 100th anniversary of the Stanley Cup.
Pittsburgh Penguins set the NHL record for longest win streak at 17 games. Conversely, the San Jose Sharks tied the NHL record for longest losing streak at 17 games.

Major transactions
June 30, 1992: Eric Lindros traded from Quebec to Philadelphia for Peter Forsberg, Ron Hextall, Mike Ricci, Kerry Huffman, Steve Duchesne, "future considerations" (eventually became enforcer Chris Simon), two first-round draft picks and US$15 million. One of the draft picks was used by the Nordiques to select goaltender Jocelyn Thibault, the other was traded twice and ultimately used by the Washington Capitals to select Nolan Baumgartner.

Records broken/tied

Regular season

Team
Most losses, one season: San Jose Sharks (71)
Fewest ties, one season: San Jose Sharks (2)
Most home losses, one season: San Jose Sharks (32)
Most road losses, one season: Ottawa Senators (40)
Fewest road wins, one season: Ottawa Senators (1)*
Longest winning streak: Pittsburgh Penguins (17) (All time NHL record)
Longest losing streak: San Jose Sharks (17)*
Longest road losing streak: Ottawa Senators (38)
Longest road winless streak: Ottawa Senators (38)
Most 100-or-more point scorers, one season: Pittsburgh Penguins (4)*
Fastest three goals from the start of period, one team: Calgary Flames (0:53, February 10, 1993)

Individual
Most goals, including playoffs: Wayne Gretzky (875)
Most 30-goal seasons: Mike Gartner (14)*
Most consecutive 30-goal seasons: Mike Gartner (14)
Most goals, one season, by a left winger: Luc Robitaille (63)
Most goals, one season, by a rookie: Teemu Selanne (76)
Most assists, one season, by a left winger: Joe Juneau (70)
Most assists, one season, by a rookie: Joe Juneau (70)* (Note: Wayne Gretzky scored 86 assists in his first year, but he was not considered a rookie)
Most points, one season, by a left winger: Luc Robitaille (125)
Most points, one season, by a rookie: Teemu Selanne (132) (Note: Wayne Gretzky scored 137 points in his first year, but he was not considered a rookie)
Most assists, one game, by a goaltender: Jeff Reese (3, February 10, 1993)
Most games missed while winning Art Ross Trophy: Mario Lemieux (24)

Playoffs

Team
Most overtime games, one playoff year: 28
Most overtime wins, one playoff year: Montreal Canadiens (10)
Most consecutive overtime wins, one playoff year: Montreal Canadiens (10)
Most consecutive wins, one playoff year: Montreal Canadiens (11)*

Individual
Most consecutive wins, one playoff year: Patrick Roy (11)*
Most goals by a defenceman, one game: Eric Desjardins (3, June 3, 1993)*
Most power-play goals, one game: Dino Ciccarelli (3, April 29, 1993)*
Most shorthanded goals, one game: Tom Fitzgerald (2, May 8, 1993)*
Most assists, one period: Adam Oates (3, April 24, 1993)*

* Equalled existing record

Debuts
The following is a list of players of note who played their first NHL game in 1992–93 (listed with their first team):
Byron Dafoe, Washington Capitals
Roman Hamrlik, Tampa Bay Lightning
Darius Kasparaitis, New York Islanders
Steve Konowalchuk, Washington Capitals
Alexei Kovalev, New York Rangers
Robert Lang, Los Angeles Kings
Eric Lindros, Philadelphia Flyers
Vladimir Malakhov, New York Islanders
Michael Nylander, Hartford Whalers
Sandis Ozolinsh, San Jose Sharks
Teemu Selanne, Winnipeg Jets
Bryan Smolinski, Boston Bruins
Martin Straka, Pittsburgh Penguins
Alexei Zhamnov, Winnipeg Jets
Sergei Zubov, New York Rangers

Last games
The following is a list of players of note who played their last game in the NHL in 1992–93 (listed with their last team):
Reggie Lemelin, Boston Bruins
Brent Ashton, Calgary Flames
John Ogrodnick, Detroit Red Wings
Tim Kerr, Hartford Whalers
Bobby Smith, Minnesota North Stars
Brian Mullen, New York Islanders
Brad Marsh, Ottawa Senators
Laurie Boschman, Ottawa Senators
Brian Hayward, San Jose Sharks
Brian Lawton, San Jose Sharks
Doug Wilson, San Jose Sharks
Rick Wamsley, Toronto Maple Leafs
Steve Kasper, Tampa Bay Lightning
Ryan Walter, Vancouver Canucks
Rod Langway, Washington Capitals
Randy Carlyle, Winnipeg Jets

Four of the five remaining helmetless players in the league played their final games: Carlyle, Marsh, Langway, and Wilson.  The only remaining helmetless player was Craig McTavish who retired following the 1996–97 season.

Trading deadline
Trading deadline: March 22, 1993.
March 22, 1993: Mark Hardy and Ottawa's fifth round choice in 1993 Entry Draft (previously acquired from Ottawa) traded from NY Rangers to Los Angeles for John McIntyre.
March 22, 1993: Jim Hrivnak and future considerations traded from Washington to Winnipeg for Rick Tabaracci.
March 22, 1993: Peter Taglianetti traded from Tampa Bay to Pittsburgh for Pittsburgh's third round choice in 1993 Entry Draft.
March 22, 1993: Steve Konroyd traded from Hartford to Detroit for Detroit's sixth round choice in 1993 Entry Draft.
March 22, 1993: Vancouver's ninth round choice in 1993 Entry Draft traded from Vancouver to Winnipeg for Dan Ratushny.
March 22, 1993: Mike Hartman traded from Tampa Bay to New York Rangers for Randy Gilhen.
March 22, 1993: Murray Craven and Vancouver's fifth round choice in 1993 Entry Draft (previously acquired from Vancouver) traded from Hartford to Vancouver for Robert Kron, Vancouver's third round choice in 1993 Entry Draft and future considerations.
March 22, 1993: Mike Ramsey traded from Buffalo to Pittsburgh for Bob Errey.
March 22, 1993: Craig Muni traded from Edmonton to Chicago for Mike Hudson.

Coaches

Prince of Wales Conference

Clarence Campbell Conference

See also
List of Stanley Cup champions
1992 NHL Entry Draft
1992 NHL Expansion Draft
1992 NHL Supplemental Draft
44th National Hockey League All-Star Game
National Hockey League All-Star Game
NHL All-Rookie Team
1992 in sports
1993 in sports

References
 
 
 
 
Notes

External links
Hockey Database

 
1
1